Burma studies is a grouping used in research universities around the world as a way of bringing together specialists from different disciplines such as history, cultural anthropology, archeology, religious studies, art history, political science, and musicology, who are doing research in these areas focused on the geographical area of what is today the country of Burma or Myanmar, often using the Burmese language, or a language of one of its ethnic groups such as the Shan, Mon, Karen, Chin, or Kachin.

Journals
The Journal of the Burma Research Society (JBRS) was the first academic journal devoted to Burma Studies. The journal started in 1911 about the same time as The Journal of the Siam Society and was published in Burma but is no longer published today. The Myanmar Historical Commission which was established in 1955 regularly publishes a journal and holds conferences in Burma

Currently, outside of Burma (Myanmar) there are two academic journals specialising in Burma Studies research articles, the Journal of Burma Studies and the SOAS Bulletin of Burma Research.

Institutions
The Center for Burma Studies at Northern Illinois University is the national center for Burma studies in the United States and one of the only centers of its kind in the world, collecting Burmese art artifacts and hosting an archive or other Burmese materials. Its current director is Dr. Catherine Raymond, Associate Professor of Art History at Northern Illinois University. The center publishes the  Journal of Burma Studies, a joint publication made in collaboration with the Burma Studies Foundation and the Burma Studies Group of the Association for Asian Studies. It is the essential, and only, peer-reviewed academic journal regarding Burma studies.

There is also a lot of activity in Burma studies at the University of Michigan, Cornell University, L'Institut national des langues et civilisations orientales, the University of Hawaii, the National University of Singapore, Tokyo University of Foreign Studies, Rutgers University, as well as in Universities and Institutes in Burma (Myanmar), such as Yangon University, Mandalay University, and the Historical Research Centre.

The Burma Studies Group of the Association for Asian Studies maintains the Burma studies e-list, created in March 2013 for the purpose of facilitating communication within the community of international scholars active in Burma/Myanmar-related studies.

The School of Oriental and African Studies (SOAS) in London was the first institution of higher education outside of Burma to have many faculty specialising in Burma Studies. Specialists in the Burmese language and literature included the scholars Hla Pe, John Okell, Anna Allot and in the history of Burma the historian D.G.E. Hall. Harry Leonard Shorto specialised in Mon language and literature. The late historian of Burma U Than Tun received his doctorate in history at SOAS. Many current specialists in Burma and its languages and ethnic groups received their doctorates at SOAS such as the historians Victor B. Lieberman and the Mon linguist Christian Bauer.

Name
Despite the name of the country having been changed to "Myanmar" by the military junta, most universities outside of Burma (Myanmar) still refer to this academic focus as "Burma studies" reflecting the contested status of the name "Myanmar" outside of the country.

See also
Sarpay Beikman
Burmese Encyclopedia
F. K. Lehman
Tilman Frasch

External links 
 Center for Burma Studies, Northern Illinois University
 Burma Research at the School of Oriental and African Studies
 Journal of Burma Studies
 SOAS Bulletin of Burma Research

 
Southeast Asian studies
History of Myanmar
Burmese culture